The episode list for the Fox sitcom Martin. The series ran from August 27, 1992 to May 1, 1997 airing 132 episodes.

Series overview

Episodes

Season 1 (1992–93)

Season 2 (1993–94)

Season 3 (1994–95)

Season 4 (1995–96)

Season 5 (1996–97)

External links 
 
 

Lists of American sitcom episodes